MRPA may refer to:

 Metropolitan River Protection Act, an environmental protection law in Georgia, U.S.
 Metropolitan Regional Planning Authority, later Western Australian Planning Commission